Anthony Butterworth FRS is a British immunologist.

He worked for the Schistosomiasis Research Group at the University of Cambridge. His laboratory work is supplemented by field studies in sub-Saharan Africa, the Philippines, South America and the United States.

He is a former trustee of the international water and sanitation charity Pump Aid.

Honours and awards
 1990 King Faisal International Prize for Medicine
 1990 Chalmers Medal of the Royal Society of Tropical Medicine and Hygiene
 1994 Elected a Fellow of the Royal Society

References

External links
https://scholar.google.com/scholar?hl=en&q=Anthony+Butterworth&btnG=Search&as_sdt=0%2C21&as_ylo=&as_vis=0

British immunologists
Academics of the University of Cambridge
Fellows of the Royal Society
Living people
Year of birth missing (living people)
Place of birth missing (living people)
Malawian academics